The Teone Church also alternatively known as the Catholic Church of Teone or the Catholic Centre of Teone, is a religious building in Vaiaku on the south coast of Fongafale in the atoll of Funafuti, which is the economic center of Tuvalu in Oceania.

Despite its small size it is the main Catholic church of the place. It follows the Roman or Latin liturgical rites, and it depends on the Mission Sui Iuris of Funafuti (Missio sui iuris Funafutina), affiliated with the Congregation for the Evangelization of Peoples and suffragan of the Metropolitan Archdiocese of Suva.

It is under the pastoral responsibility of Reynaldo B. Getalado, who is from the Philippines.

See also

References

Roman Catholic churches in Tuvalu
Funafuti